Blades Glacier is a glacier flowing east from the snow-covered saddle just north of La Gorce Peak, Alexandra Mountains. It merges with Dalton Glacier on the north side of Edward VII Peninsula. It was mapped by the United States Geological Survey from surveys and from U.S. Navy air photos, 1959–65, and named by the Advisory Committee on Antarctic Names for William Robert Blades who served as navigator during U.S. Navy Operation Highjump (1946–47) and Operation Deep Freeze (1955–59).

See also
 List of glaciers in the Antarctic
 Glaciology

References
 

Glaciers of King Edward VII Land